Michael F. Shlesinger (born August 8, 1948 in Brooklyn, New York) is a physicist notable for his work in the area of nonlinear dynamics. He is the co-founder of the journal Fractals. His pioneering work in statistical predictions and descriptions of random and deterministic processes has influenced the physics of amorphous solids and glasses, classical mechanics, and biophysics. He is known as a proponent of fractal time and is also known for his work on fractal stochastic processes related to areas such as disordered materials and turbulence.

Education

In 1970, he obtained his BS degree in physics and mathematics from State University of New York at Stony Brook, and then obtained his MA in 1972 from the University of Rochester. In 1975, he obtained his PhD from the University of Rochester under Elliott Waters Montroll for a thesis entitled A Stochastic Theory of Anomalous Transient Photocurrents in Certain Xerographic Films and of the 1/f Noise in Neural Membrane.

Career
Initially he worked at the University of Maryland, College Park, then in 1983 he joined Office of Naval Research (ONR) and started their nonlinear dynamics program in 1984. He subsequently went on to head their physics division, before being named ONR's chief scientist for nonlinear science. His contributions to nonlinear dynamics and statistical physics include the publication of over 200 papers, editorship of over 20 books, and the organization of over 30 conferences. In 2008, he took up the Kinnear Chair in Physics at the US Naval Academy,
Annapolis, United States. In 2021 published "An Unbounded Experience in Random Walks with Applications" (World Scientific Pub)

Honors
He was elected to Fellow of the American Physical Society in 1993. In 2004, he received the Presidential Rank Award. In 2006, he received ONR's Saalfeld Award for outstanding lifetime achievement. In 2008, he was honored with a festschrift to mark his 60th birthday, entitled 25 Years of Nonlinear Dynamics at ONR, based on a conference held on Amelia Island, Florida, July 20–22, 2008.

Public Service
While residing in Rockville, Maryland, he once saved the life of a woman who was being mauled by a pack of rottweilers.  For putting his life at risk, the city of Rockville presented him with a medal for heroism.

Name
His middle name is the single initial "F"—he does not have a full middle name; another famous example being the middle initial of Harry S. Truman.

See also
 Fractal time
 Nonlinear dynamics

Bibliography

External links
Shlesinger's math genealogy
Shlesinger Nature article
2004 Presidential rank awards
Saalfed award
 Shlesinger at Bioinfobank
Shlesinger at Scientific Commons

1948 births
Living people
Stony Brook University alumni
University of Rochester alumni
Fellows of the American Physical Society
21st-century American physicists
Jewish physicists
Jewish scientists
Probability theorists